Living the Blues is the third album by Canned Heat, a double album released in late 1968.  It was one of the first double albums to place well on album charts. It features Canned Heat's signature song, "Going Up the Country", which would later be used in the Woodstock film. John Mayall appears on piano on "Walking by Myself" and "Bear Wires". Dr. John appears on "Boogie Music".  The 20-minute trippy suite "Parthenogenesis" is dwarfed by the album-length "Refried Boogie", recorded live.

Track listing
Side one
"Pony Blues" (Charlie Patton) – 3:48
"My Mistake" (Alan Wilson) – 3:22
"Sandy's Blues" (Bob Hite) – 6:46
"Going Up the Country" (Wilson; in fact written by Henry Thomas but not attributed.) – 2:50
"Walking by Myself" (Jimmy Rogers) – 2:29
"Boogie Music" (L.T. Tatman III) – 3:00
 "Tell Me Man Blues" (1929 recording by Henry Sims) – 0:15

Side two
"One Kind Favor" (Lemon Jefferson) – 4:44
"Parthenogenesis" (Canned Heat) – 19:57
 I Nebulosity
 II Rollin' and Tumblin'
 III Five Owls
 IV Bear Wires
 V Snooky Flowers
 VI Sunflower Power (RMS Is Truth)
 VII Raga Kafi
 VIII Icebag
 IX Childhood's End

Side three
"Refried Boogie (Part I)" (Canned Heat) (Recorded Live) – 20:10

Side four
"Refried Boogie (Part II)" (Canned Heat) (Recorded Live) – 20:50

Personnel
Canned Heat
Bob Hite – vocals
Alan Wilson – slide guitar, vocals, harmonica, jaw-harp (tracks 2.I, 2.II, 2.IX), chromatic harp (track 2.VIII)
Henry Vestine – lead guitar
Larry Taylor – bass, congas (track 2.V)
Adolfo de la Parra – drums

Additional Personnel
Dr. John – horn arrangements, piano (track 6)
Miles Grayson – horn arrangements (track 3)
 John Fahey – guitar (track 2.I)
 John Mayall – piano (tracks 5 & 2.IV)
Jim Horn – flute (track 4)
Joe Sample – piano (track 3)

Production
Rich Moore – engineer
Ivan Fisher – assistant engineer
Skip Taylor – producer
Canned Heat – producer

References

1968 albums
Canned Heat albums
Liberty Records albums